Arthur Hays may refer to:

 Arthur Garfield Hays (1881–1954), American lawyer and champion of civil liberties issues
 Arthur Bell Hays (1882–1944), American football, basketball, and baseball coach

See also
Arthur Hayes (disambiguation)